Aldemar Reyes Ortega (born 22 April 1995) is a Colombian professional racing cyclist, who currently rides for UCI Continental team . He was named in the startlist for the 2017 Vuelta a España.

Major results

2014
 1st  Young rider classification Vuelta a Colombia
2016
 4th Overall Giro della Valle d'Aosta
 5th Overall Ronde de l'Isard
 6th Overall Tour Alsace
 10th Overall Vuelta a Colombia
1st  Young rider classification 
 10th Overall Grande Prémio Internacional de Torres Vedras
1st  Young rider classification
2017
 1st  Mountains classification Volta ao Alentejo
 6th Circuito de Getxo
 7th Overall Vuelta a la Comunidad de Madrid
1st  Mountains classification
2020
 1st  Overall Vuelta al Tolima
1st Stage 1
2021
 7th Overall Vuelta a Colombia
1st  Points classification 
1st Stage 5 
2022
 1st  Road race, Bolivarian Games
 3rd Overall Vuelta del Porvenir San Luis

Grand Tour general classification results timeline

References

External links

1995 births
Living people
Colombian male cyclists
Sportspeople from Boyacá Department
21st-century Colombian people